Marshall Bridge may refer to:

Marshall Covered Bridge, Rockville, Indiana, also known as Marshall Bridge, listed on the National Register of Historic Places in Parke County, Indiana
Marshall Bridge (Marshall, Washington), listed on the National Register of Historic Places in Spokane County, Washington